Donald Muller Foulis (13 December 1908 – 14 March 1989) was a male English international table tennis player.

Table tennis career
He was selected to represent England during the 1934 World Table Tennis Championships in the Swaythling Cup. The other team members were Eric Findon, Herbert 'Willie' Hales, Ken Hyde and Andrew Millar and they finished in seventh place.

He represented Liverpool at club level and won five men's singles titles at the Liverpool & District Table Tennis League.

See also
 List of England players at the World Team Table Tennis Championships

References

English male table tennis players
1908 births
1989 deaths